Chua Chu Kang Single Member Constituency was a single member constituency (SMC) located in the western region of Singapore. The constituency encompasses Choa Chu Kang New Town. It is one of the longest existing constituencies in Singapore, spanning 52 years from 1959 to 2011.

Throughout its relatively long history, the ruling People's Action Party has won the constituency in every election, except the 1963 general election when it lost the seat to opposition party Barisan Sosialis. Chua Chu Kang SMC faced a four-cornered fight, including the ruling party itself in the 1997 general election and the PAP was challenged by Singapore Democratic Alliance's Steve Chia in the 2001 and 2006 general elections. In the 2011 general election, the SMC and Hong Kah Group Representation Constituency (GRC) were absorbed into Chua Chu Kang GRC.

Members of Parliament

Elections

Elections in the 2000s

Elections in the 1990s

Elections in the 1980s

Elections in the 1970s

Elections in the 1960s

Elections in the 1950s

References
1959 GE result
1963 GE result
1968 GE result
1972 GE result
1976 GE result
1980 GE result
1984 GE result
1988 GE result
1991 GE result
1997 GE result
2001 GE result
2006 GE result

Singaporean electoral divisions
Choa Chu Kang
Tengah